NGC 4876 is an elliptical galaxy located about 325 million light-years away in the constellation Coma Berenices. NGC 4876 was discovered by astronomer Guillaume Bigourdan on May 16, 1885. NGC 4876 is a member of the Coma Cluster.

See also 
 List of NGC objects (4001–5000)
 NGC 4889

References

External links
 

Coma Berenices
Coma Cluster
Elliptical galaxies
4876 
44658 
Astronomical objects discovered in 1885